Trobelno is a small dispersed settlement in the hills above the Tuhinj Valley in the Municipality of Kamnik in the Upper Carniola region of Slovenia.

References

External links

Trobelno on Geopedia

Populated places in the Municipality of Kamnik